Ian Angus may refer to:
 Ian Angus (activist) (born 1945), Canadian socialist and ecosocialist activist
 Ian Angus (footballer) (born 1961), Scottish former footballer
 Ian Angus (librarian) (1926–2022), British librarian and editor
 Ian Angus (philosopher) (born 1949), Canadian interdisciplinary philosopher

See also

 Iain Angus (born 1947), Canadian politician